The Terre Haute, Brazil and Eastern Railroad was a short-line railroad that was incorporated May 1, 1987 and began operations on October 15, 1987. The TBER operated over 30 miles of the Pennsylvania Railroad's St. Louis-Indianapolis-Pittsburgh Line, which had been abandoned by Conrail in 1984 in favor of the former New York Central-Big Four St. Louis Line subdivision. The line extended from Terre Haute to Limedale and included a seven-mile branch line to the Amax Coal Company's Chinook Mine south of Brazil. 
 
The TBER interchanged with the Soo Line Railroad's Latta Subdivision, Conrail's St. Louis Line and CSX's CE&D Subdivision in Terre Haute. Traffic was an even mix of lumber, fertilizer, and plastic pellets inbound and grain, cement, and plastic pipe outbound. A tourist excursion called the Beaver Hawk Express was operated under contract between Brazil, Indiana and Limedale. Coal traffic was also anticipated but failed to materialize, as a result the line entered bankruptcy. The TBER ceased operation on December 31, 1993 and the line was dismantled.

Motive Power
The TBER operated three locomotives. 
100 an ex-Missouri Pacific EMD SW1200
101 an ex-Chicago Rock Island & Pacific EMD SW8
6999 an ex-Pennsylvania, Penn Central, Conrail EMD SD7 was owned by the proprietors of the Beaver Hawk Express and never saw service on the TBER.

References

External links
Don's Rail Photos Indiana Short Lines and Industrial Railroads

Defunct Indiana railroads